The General Confederation of the Portuguese Workers (Portuguese: Confederação Geral dos Trabalhadores Portugueses or CGTP) is the largest trade union federation in Portugal. It was founded informally in 1970, emerged publicly after the Carnation Revolution in 1974 and was legalised the following year by the National Salvation Junta.

Affiliates
National Union of Local Administration Workers - STAL	Lisbon	
Telecommunications and Audiovisual Communication Workers Union - STT	Lisbon	
Union of Customs Workers in Brokers and Companies	Lisbon	
Union of Agricultural Workers and the Food, Beverage and Tobacco Industries of Portugal - SINTAB	Lisbon	
Union of Technical Agents of Architecture and Engineering - SATAE	Lisbon	
Union of Financial Activity Workers - SINTAF	Lisbon	
Union of Aviation and Airport Workers - SIAVA	Lisbon	
Union of Workers of Caixa Geral de Depósitos Group Companies - STEC	Lisbon	
Union of Captains, Officers, Pilots, Commissioners and Engineers of the Merchant Marine - OFFICIALMAR	Lisbon	
Southern Meat Industry Workers Union	Lisbon	
Union of Workers in the Ceramic, Cement and Similar Industries of the South and Autonomous Regions	Lisbon	
Union of Commerce Workers, Offices and Services of Portugal - CESP	Lisbon	
Union of Construction, Timber, Marble and Cork Workers of the South	Lisbon	
National Union of Postal and Telecommunications Workers - SNTCT	Lisbon	
National Union of Electrical Industries of the South and Islands - SIESI	Lisbon	
Portuguese Nurses Union - SEP	Lisbon	
Show Workers Union - STE	Lisbon	
Union of Civil Workers of the Armed Forces, Manufacturing Establishments and Defense Companies - STEFFA'S	Lisbon	
National Union of Railway Sector Workers - SNTSF	Lisbon	
Union of Public Service Workers of the South and Azores - STFPSA	Lisbon	
Union of Judicial Employees - SFJ	Lisbon	
Union of Workers in the Industry of Hospitality, Tourism, Restaurants and Similar in the South	Lisbon	
Professional Football Players Union	Lisbon	
Union of Merchant Marine Workers, Travel Agencies, Freight Forwarders and Fisheries - SIMAMEVIP	Lisbon	
South Zone Physicians Union	Lisbon	
National Union of Veterinarians	Lisbon	
Union of Workers in Manufacturing Industries, Energy and Environmental Activities in the Centre, South and Autonomous Regions - SITE CSRA	Lisbon	
Mining Industry Workers Union	Lisbon	
Lisbon Municipality Workers Union - STML	Lisbon	
Musicians Union	Lisbon	
Free Trade Union of Fishermen and Related Professions	Lisbon	
Union of Concierge, Surveillance, Cleaning, Household and Miscellaneous Activities Workers	Lisbon	
Greater Lisbon Teachers Union - SPGL	Lisbon	
National Psychologists Union	Lisbon	
Union of Drawing Staff and Technicians - SQTD	Lisbon	
National Union of Telecommunications and Audiovisual Workers - SINTTAV	Lisbon	
Textile, Wool, Clothing, Footwear and Leatherworkers Union of the South	Lisbon	
Union of River, Coastal and Merchant Marine Transport	Lisbon	
Union of Road and Urban Transport Workers of Portugal - STRUP	Lisbon	
Union of Electrical Industries of the South and Islands - SIESI	Lisbon	
Union of Workers in the Footwear, Bags and Related Industries of the Districts of Aveiro and Coimbra
Union of Northern Cork Workers
Union of Dairy Professionals
Union of Workers of the Transforming Industries, Energy and Environmental Activities of the Center North - SITE CN
Aveiro Textile Sector Workers Union
Union of Footwear, Bags and Related Products, Components, Shapes and Tanneries of Minho and Trás-os-Montes
Trade Workers Union, Offices and Services of Minho
Union of Construction, Timber, Marble, Quarry, Ceramic and Related Workers, North Region of the Douro River
Baga District Tanning Industry Workers Union
Union of Workers in the Industry and Trade of Bakery, Milling, Confectionery, Pastry and Similar in Minho
Textile Union of Minho and Trás-os-Montes
Northern Clothing, Apparel and Textile Workers Union
Beira Baixa Textile Sector Workers Union
Union of Workers in the Ceramic, Cement, Construction, Wood, Marble and Similar Industries of the Central Region
Union of Workers in Public and Social Functions of the Centre
Union of Workers in the Hospitality, Tourism, Restaurants and Similar Industry of the Centre
Zona Centro Doctors Union - SMZC
Fishermen's Union of the District of Coimbra
Union of Teachers of the Center Region - SPRC
Union of Textile, Wool and Clothing Workers of the Centre
South Zone Teachers Union - SPZS
Union of Workers in the Canning Industry and Related Crafts of the District of FARO
Union of Workers in the Algarve Hotel, Tourism, Restaurant and Similar Industry
Southern Fisheries Workers Union
Union of Textile Sector Workers of Beira Alta
Center Fisheries Workers Union
Glass Industry Workers Union
Union of Cork Workers of the District of Portalegre
Northern Food Industry Workers Union - STIANOR
National Union of Workers in the Beverage Industry and Commerce
Northern Meat Workers Union
Union of Workers in the Ceramics, Cement and Similar Industries of the North Region
Union of Health Sciences and Technologies
Union of Construction Workers, Timber, Marble, Quarry, Ceramics and Construction Materials of Portugal
Trade Union of Tannery Industry Workers
Union of Stoves, Energy and Manufacturing Industries - SIFOMATE
Northern Civil Service Workers Union - STFPN
Northern Hospitality, Tourism, Restaurants and Similar Industry Workers Union
Northern Doctors Union
Northern Manufacturing, Energy and Environmental Activities Workers Union - SITE NORTE
Northern Fisheries Workers Union
Northern Teachers Union - SPN
Union of Health, Solidarity and Social Security Workers
Union of Workers in the Textile, Clothing, Footwear and Tannery Sectors of the District of Porto - SINTEVECC
Union of Transport Workers of the Metropolitan Area of Porto
Northern Road and Urban Transport Workers Union - STRUN
National Union of Professionals in the Industry and Trade of Clothing and Textiles - SINPICVAT
Union of Food Industry Workers of the Centre, South and Islands
National Union of Workers in the Tanning Industry and Related Trades of the District of Santarém
Portuguese Physiotherapists Union
Union of Workers of Manufacturing Industries, Energy and Environmental Activities of the South - SITE SUL
Union of Civil Construction, Timber, Marble and Quarry Workers of the District of Viana do Castelo
Union of Workers of the Metallurgical and Metalworking Industries of the District of Viana do Castelo
National Union of Funchal Warehouse Professionals
Free Union of Workers in the Embroidery, Tapestry, Textile and Handicraft Industry of the Autonomous Region of Madeira
Union of CONSTRUCTION, Timber, Pottery and Related Workers of the Autonomous Region of Madeira - SICOMA
Union of Workers in the Electric Energy Production, Transport and Distribution Sector of the Autonomous Region of Madeira - STEEM
Union of Nurses of the Autonomous Region of Madeira - SERAM
Union of Office, Commerce and Services Workers of the Autonomous Region of Madeira - SITAM
Union of Civil Service Workers of the Autonomous Region of Madeira - STFP-RAM
Union of workers in the HOSPITALITY, Tourism, Food, Services and Similar of the Autonomous Region of Madeira
Madeira Teachers Union - SPM
Union of Road Workers and Metallurgical Activities of the Autonomous Region of Madeira
Azores Region Teachers Union - SPRA
Azores Food, Beverage and Similar, Commerce, Office and Services Workers Union - SABCES
Horta Civil Construction Union
Union of Office, Commerce and Services Employees of Horta
Union of Transport, Tourism and other Horta Professionals
Free Trade Union of Maritime Fishermen and Related Professionals of the Azores
Union of Professionals from the Manufacturing Industries of the Islands of São Miguel and Santa Maria
Transport, Tourism and Other Services Professionals Union of São Miguel and Santa Maria
Teachers Abroad Union

General Secretaries
1974: Francisco Canais Rocha
1974: Post vacant
1977: Armando Artur Teixeira da Silva
1986: Manuel Carvalho da Silva
2012: Arménio Carlos
2020: Isabel Camarinha

References

External links

 General Confederation of the Portuguese Workers Official Site

National federations of trade unions
Trade unions in Portugal
World Federation of Trade Unions
Trade unions established in 1970